Gabriel Jose García Fernández (born January 8, 1999) is a Puerto Rican professional volleyball player with American citizenship. At the professional club level, he plays for Cucine Lube Civitanova. 

He used to represent the Puerto Rico national team in the past. In 2022, the FIVB allowed him to change his sports nationality. Garcia will be eligible to compete for the United States in 2024.

Honours

College
 National championships
 2021  NCAA National Championship, with BYU Cougars

Clubs
 FIVB Club World Championship
  Betim 2021 – with Cucine Lube Civitanova

 National championships
 2021/2022  Italian Championship, with Cucine Lube Civitanova

Individual awards
 2021: NCAA National Championship – All Tournament Team

References

External links

 
 Player profile at LegaVolley.it 
 Player profile at Volleybox.net

1999 births
Living people
Sportspeople from San Juan, Puerto Rico
Puerto Rican men's volleyball players
Puerto Rican expatriate sportspeople in Italy
Expatriate volleyball players in Italy
BYU Cougars men's volleyball players
Opposite hitters